Tephritis daedala is a species of tephritid or fruit flies in the genus Tephritis of the family Tephritidae.

Distribution
Nepal.

References

Tephritinae
Insects described in 1964
Diptera of Asia